The Shutrukid dynasty (c. 1210 – 1100 BC) was a dynasty of the Elamite empire, in modern Iran. Under the Shutrukids, Elam reached a height in power.

History
Shutruk-Nakhkhunte and his three sons, Kutir-Nakhkhunte II, Shilhak-In-Shushinak, and Khutelutush-In-Shushinak were capable of frequent military campaigns into Kassite Babylonia (which was also being ravaged by the empire of Assyria during this period), and at the same time were exhibiting vigorous construction activity—building and restoring luxurious temples in Susa and across their Empire. Shutruk-Nakhkhunte raided Babylonia, carrying home to Susa trophies like the statues of Marduk and Manishtushu, the Manishtushu Obelisk, the Stele of Hammurabi and the stele of Naram-Sin. With these trophies, he attempted to give a new aura to Elam, as the conqueror of Babylonia. Shutruk-Nakhunte added his own inscription on the stele of Naram-Sin:

In 1158 BC, after much of Babylonia had been annexed by Ashur-Dan I of Assyria and Shutruk-Nakhkhunte, the Elamites defeated permanently the Kassites, a dynasty which had ruled Mesopotamia for four centuries. They killed the Kassite king of Babylon, Zababa-shuma-iddin, and replaced him with Shutruk-Nakhkhunte's eldest son, Kutir-Nakhkhunte, who held it no more than three years before being ejected by the native Akkadian speaking Babylonians. The Elamites then briefly came into conflict with Assyria, managing to take the Assyrian city of Arrapha (modern Kirkuk) before being ultimately defeated and having a treaty forced upon them by Ashur-Dan I.

Kutir-Nakhkhunte's son Khutelutush-In-Shushinak was defeated by Nebuchadnezzar I of Babylon, who sacked Susa and returned the statue of Marduk, but who was then himself defeated by the Assyrian king Ashur-resh-ishi I. He fled to Anshan, but later returned to Susa, and his brother Shilhana-Hamru-Lagamar may have succeeded him as last king of the Shutrukid dynasty. Following Khutelutush-In-Shushinak, the power of the Elamite empire began to wane, for after the death of this ruler, Elam disappears into obscurity for more than three centuries.

Rulers

See also
List of rulers of Elam

References

Sources
Quintana Cifuentes, E., "Historia de Elam el vecino mesopotámico", Murcia, 1997. Estudios Orientales. IPOA-Murcia.
Quintana Cifuentes, E., "Textos y Fuentes para el estudio del Elam", Murcia, 2000. Estudios Orientales. IPOA-Murcia.
 Quintana Cifuentes, E., La Lengua Elamita (Irán pre-persa), Madrid, 2010. Gram Ediciones. 
Khačikjan, Margaret: The Elamite Language, Documenta Asiana IV, Consiglio Nazionale delle Ricerche Istituto per gli Studi Micenei ed Egeo-Anatolici, 1998 
Persians: Masters of Empire, Time-Life Books, Alexandria, Virginia (1995) 

D. T. Potts, "Elamites and Kassites in the Persian Gulf",Journal of Near Eastern Studies, vol. 65, no. 2, pp. 111–119, (April 2006)
 
McAlpin, David W., Proto Elamo Dravidian: The Evidence and Its Implications, American Philosophy Society (1981) 
Vallat, François. 2010. "The History of Elam". The Circle of Ancient Iranian Studies (CAIS)

Elamite kings
Shuturukid dynasty